Don Juan Ortega y Montañés (also Juan de Ortega Cano Montañez y Patiño) (July 3, 1627 in Siles, Spain – December 16, 1708 in Mexico City) was a Roman Catholic bishop and colonial administrator in Guatemala and New Spain. He was successively bishop of Durango (1670 to 1681), of Guatemala (1681 to 1684) and of Michoacán (1684 to March 24, 1700), and then archbishop of Mexico (June 21, 1700 to December 16, 1708). He also served as interim viceroy of New Spain from February 27, 1696, to December 18, 1696, and again from November 4, 1701, to November 27, 1702.

Education and ecclesiastical career
Ortega y Montañés was a native of Cartagena. Some sources give a different birth date: June 23, 1627. He studied at Cartagena, at Málaga, and at Alcalá de Henares, where he graduated with a doctorate in jurisprudence. He was named inquisitor for New Spain, and it was there that he entered the service of the Church. He was bishop of Durango, then Guatemala, then Michoacán (Valladolid). He was known for his opposition to clerical abuse and arbitrariness, and also for his support of simple happiness and poverty among the clergy. He had also a reputation for charity, concern for the parishioners, and energy in his work.

First term as viceroy
In February 1696 he was named interim viceroy of New Spain, to succeed Gaspar de la Cerda, 8th Count of Galve.

One of the first challenges of his administration was the suppression of an uprising of university students. On March 27, 1696, they tried to burn the scaffold in the Plaza de Armas, which they saw as "an annoying manifestation of the power of the monarchy." This caused great alarm in Mexico City. The constables broke up the demonstration, arresting a youth named Francisco González de Castro. The students tried to rescue him as he was being escorted to jail, pelting the constables with rocks.

The other important event of this viceroy's first term was the sending of a Jesuit expedition to evangelize and colonize the Californias. This expedition included the famous missionary fathers Eusebio Kino and Juan María Salvatierra. The two fathers had founded the Fondo Piadoso de California on August 15, 1696, to continue the work of colonization.

A new viceroy, José Sarmiento y Valladares, conde de Moctezuma y de Tula, took up the government on December 13, 1696, and Bishop Ortega y Montañés returned to his see in Michoacán. He remained there until March, 1700, when he was made archbishop of Mexico.

Second term as viceroy
A ship arrived in Veracruz on March 6, 1701, carrying the news of the death of King Charles II of Spain on November 1 of the previous year. Charles II left no heir. The War of the Spanish Succession, between Spain and France on the one hand and Austria, England and Holland on the other, began to determine his successor. The viceroy at the time, Sarmiento y Valladares, was a supporter of the Habsburg claims to the Spanish throne. (The Bourbons were in control in Spain.) He was removed from office and Ortega was once again named interim viceroy.

Ortega y Montañés's formal consecration as archbishop of Mexico occurred January 6, 1702, while he was again serving as viceroy. The archbishop was distinguished for his devotion to the Virgin of Guadalupe, patron of Mexico, whose church was finished under this administration (1702). The archbishop personally toured, asking for alms to support the construction.

He suspended the transportation of prisoners from New Spain to Puerto Rico, which his predecessor Sarmiento y Valladares had begun.

The viceroy received word that the conde de Chateau-Renaud had arrived in Havana with a French fleet to transport the tribute of New Spain to France. Viceroy Ortega consulted with the Audiencia, and the decision was reached not to turn over the tribute to the French without express orders from the Spanish Crown.

On November 18, 1702, Archbishop Ortega left Mexico City for Otumba to welcome the new viceroy, Francisco Fernández de la Cueva, 10th Duke of Alburquerque, and turn over temporal power to him.

Ortega died in 1708, still occupying the see of Mexico. He left behind various writings. These included Informe del Estado de la Nueva España, written for his first successor, José Sarmiento y Valladares. It was a report on the state of the colony at the end of the seventeenth century.

References
 García Puron, this needs more information, México y sus gobernantes, v. 1. Mexico City: Joaquín Porrua, 1984.
 Orozco L., Fernando, Fechas Históricas de México. Mexico City: Panorama Editorial, 1988, .
 Orozco Linares, Fernando, Gobernantes de México. Mexico City: Panorama Editorial, 1985, .

External links and additional sources
 (for Chronology of Bishops) 
 (for Chronology of Bishops) 
 (for Chronology of Bishops) 
 (for Chronology of Bishops) 
 (for Chronology of Bishops) 
 (for Chronology of Bishops) 

1627 births
1708 deaths
Viceroys of New Spain
17th-century Roman Catholic bishops in New Spain
18th-century Roman Catholic archbishops in Mexico
Roman Catholic archbishops of Mexico (city)
Roman Catholic bishops of Guatemala (pre-1743)
Mexican Roman Catholic archbishops